Aaptos laxosuberites is a species of sea sponge belonging to the family Suberitidae. The species was described in 1902.

References

Aaptos
Sponges described in 1902